Palampur Express is a Hindi language television series that aired on Sony Entertainment Television from 25 May 2009 till 28 October 2009. The story is based on the life of a young woman, Paavni, dreams of becoming an Olympic runner.

Cast 
 Pooja Kanwal / Akanksha Rawat as Pavni Dikshit
 Ajay Chaudhary as Dhruv 
 Rajesh Asthana as Ravikant Dikshit 
 Amita Udgata as Dadi 
 Adaa Khan as Pavni's Best Friend
 Rinku Karmarkar as Sudha 
 Anita Kulkarni as Shikha Dikshit 
 Hiten Tejwani as Dev Sisodia
 Divya Singh as Mona
 Krutika Desai Khan as Ila Singh 
 Tanya Abrol as Paramjeet Kaur
 Tanvi Thakkar as Lavanya Singh 
 Tej Sapru as MLA 
 Akshat Gupta as Tej
 Nitin as Sarju Dogra
 Yash Gera as Paaji

References

External links 
Palampur Express Official Site on Sony TV India

Sony Entertainment Television original programming
2009 Indian television series debuts
Indian drama television series